Ali Ashraf Siddiqui is an Indian politician from Bihar who is a Member of the Bihar Legislative Assembly. Siddiqui won the election of Nathnagar constituency on the Rashtriya Janata Dal ticket in the 2020 Bihar Legislative Assembly election.

References

Living people
Bihar MLAs 2020–2025
Rashtriya Janata Dal politicians
Year of birth missing (living people)